Rumjungle was a popular Las Vegas restaurant and nightclub built as a part of the Mandalay Bay Resort and Casino original construction. It consistently made the Nightclub & Bar Magazine list of the Top 100 nightclubs in the United States, and was in the Top 20 of Restaurant & Institutions Top 100 Grossing Restaurants in the United States.

It was the largest Brazilian (Churrascaria style) restaurant in the world, and had the largest rum list in the world; its rum bar was 144 feet long and 19 feet high.

Rumjungle filed for bankruptcy in March 2010 and has since closed.

See also
 List of restaurants in the Las Vegas Valley

References

Defunct nightclubs in the Las Vegas Valley
Restaurants in the Las Vegas Valley
Mandalay Bay